Bedford County School District (BCSD) or Bedford County Schools is a school district headquartered in Shelbyville, Tennessee.

History

The first class of African-American students graduated from the district in May 1890. In 1964 African-American students became admitted to schools previously reserved for white children due to the Civil Rights Act of 1964.

Schools
High schools:
 Cascade High School
 Community High School
 Shelbyville Central High School
 Bedford County Virtual High School (Currently only 9th and 10th grades)

Middle schools:
 Cascade Middle School
 Community Middle School
 Harris Middle School
 Liberty Middle School
 Bedford County Virtual Middle School

Elementary schools:
 Bedford County Learning Academy
 Cascade Elementary School
 Community Elementary School
 Eakin Elementary School
 East Side Elementary School
 Learning Way Elementary School
 Liberty Elementary School
 Southside Elementary School
 Thomas Magnet School
 Bedford County Virtual Elementary School

The district previously operated East Bedford School and Bedford County Training School for Negroes, the latter previously John McAdams High School and also Harris High School for Negroes. These schools were reserved for black students. In 1967 it merged into Shelbyville Central.

Demographics

In the Jim Crow period circa 1930s to 1960s the district had around 700 African-American students.

References

External links
 Bedford County Schools
School districts in Tennessee
Education in Bedford County, Tennessee